Queen Anne High School (1909–1981) was a Seattle Public Schools high school on Galer Street atop Queen Anne Hill in Seattle, Washington, United States. The building was converted to condominium apartments in 2007.

The school was built in 1908 with additions in 1929 and 1955, and was listed on the National Register of Historic Places in 1985. It is also an official City of Seattle landmark.

The school closed in 1981 due to decreasing enrollment.  Students in the school's attendance area transferred to various high schools in the district. The school facility underwent renovation and adaptive reuse to become a residential apartment building in 1986, with 137 apartments. In 2006 the residential apartments underwent another renovation and converted to condominium units.

Notable alumni
Steve Anderson - silver medalist at the 1928 Summer Olympics in the 110-meter hurdles. Tied the world record in the 120-yard hurdles.
 Rex Buren Beisel – Aviation engineer
 Howard Brandt, Class of 1958 – physicist
 Walter Houser Brattain, 1956 Nobel Prize in Physics; attended for one year.
 Arthur C. Brooks, Class of 1981 – social scientist and president of the American Enterprise Institute
 Tory Bruno, Class of 1979 - aerospace executive and rocket scientist.  CEO of United Launch Alliance 
 Peter W. Chiarelli, Class of 1968 – Vice Chief of Staff of the United States Army (2008–2012)
 Donald R. Colvin, Class of 1936 – law clerk to Justice William O. Douglas, U.S. Supreme Court
 Kathi Goertzen, Class of 1976 – television reporter and news anchor
 Leslie Groves, Class of 1914 – Lieutenant General, oversaw the construction of the Pentagon, directed the Manhattan Project
 Dwight Gustafson, Class of 1948 – composer, music educator.
 Bob Houbregs, Class of 1949 – member, Naismith Basketball Hall of Fame
 L. Ron Hubbard – founded the Church of Scientology
Helmi Juvonen, Class of 1922 - Artist (Northwest School)
 Hank Ketcham, Class of 1937 – creator of Dennis the Menace
 Gary Kildall, Class of 1960 - was an American computer scientist and creator of CP/M, the first standard operating system for personal computers
 Lucile Lomen, Class of 1937 – first woman law clerk at U.S. Supreme Court
 Peter Norton, Class of 1961 – American computer guru / philanthropist
 Joel Pritchard, Class of 1944 – American businessman and politician, served in U.S. House of Representatives, the 14th Lieutenant Governor of Washington, and co-inventor of pickleball
 Mary Randlett, – attended but did not graduate, before becoming a photographer of the Northwest School
 Harold Weeks, – jazz composer
 Kirby Wilbur - radio personality and conservative political activist

Notes

External links

National Register of Historic Places - Queen Anne High School
Queen Anne High School Alumni Association

National Register of Historic Places in Seattle
Educational institutions established in 1909
Educational institutions disestablished in 1981
Residential buildings in Seattle
Defunct schools in Washington (state)
Schools in Seattle
School buildings on the National Register of Historic Places in Washington (state)
1900s architecture in the United States
1909 establishments in Washington (state)
Queen Anne, Seattle
1981 disestablishments in Washington (state)